Bromodomain adjacent to zinc finger domain protein 2A is a protein that in humans is encoded by the BAZ2A gene.

References

External links

Further reading